"Honest" is a song by American electronic music duo The Chainsmokers. It is the third single from the duo's debut album, Memories...Do Not Open. The song was released to Top 40 radio on July 11, 2017.

Composition
The song is written in the key of E♭ major and has a tempo of 100 beats per minute. The intro features a spoken word part by Bono of U2.

Track listing

Charts

Weekly charts

Year-end charts

Certifications

Release history

References

2017 singles
2017 songs
The Chainsmokers songs
Songs written by Audra Mae
Songs written by Sean Douglas (songwriter)
Songs written by Andrew Taggart
Disruptor Records singles